Coon Creek is a stream in Taney County in the U.S. state of Missouri. It is a tributary of Lake Taneycomo.

Coon Creek was so named on account of raccoons in the area.

See also
List of rivers of Missouri

References

Rivers of Taney County, Missouri
Rivers of Missouri